The Heart Raider is a 1923 silent film romantic comedy produced by Famous Players-Lasky and released by Paramount Pictures. It is based on an original story for the screen and was directed by Wesley Ruggles and starred Agnes Ayres and Mahlon Hamilton. A Czech release print survives at George Eastman House, Rochester, New York.

Brothers Charles and Wesley Ruggles on a rare occasion work here on the same film. Future torch singer Helen Morgan has an uncredited extra part.

Cast
Agnes Ayres - Muriel Gray
Mahlon Hamilton - John Dennis
Charles Ruggles - Gaspard McMahon
Marie Burke - Mrs. Dennis
Charles Riegel - Jeremiah Wiggins

uncredited
Fraser Coalter - Reginald Gray
Helen Morgan - Extra

References

External links

Swedish lobby poster

1923 films
American silent feature films
Films directed by Wesley Ruggles
Films based on short fiction
Paramount Pictures films
1923 romantic comedy films
American romantic comedy films
American black-and-white films
1920s American films
Silent romantic comedy films
Silent American comedy films